2017 Thai League 3 (Euro Cake League Pro) Lower Region is the 1st season of the League, its establishment in 2017. It is a part of the Thai League 3 and the feeder league for the Thai League 2. A total of 15 teams will compete in the league this season.

Changes from Last Season

Team changes

Promoted Clubs

Five club was promoted from the 2016 Thai Division 2 League Western Region
 Samut Sakhon
 Krung Thonburi
 Ratchaphruek University
 Simork
 BTU United

Three club was promoted from the 2016 Thai Division 2 League Bangkok & field Region
 Chamchuri United
 Bangkok University Deffo
 Royal Thai Army

Four club was promoted from the 2016 Thai Division 2 League Bangkok & Eastern Region
 Rajpracha
 MOF Customs United
 Banbueng
 Kasem Bundit University

Four club was promoted from the 2016 Thai Division 2 League Southern Region
 Surat Thani
 Nara United
 Trang
 Ranong United

Renamed Clubs

 Nakhon Si Thammarat Unity authorize from Ratchaphruek University

Expansion Clubs

 BTU United Club-licensing football club didn't pass to play 2017 Thai League 3 Lower Region. This team is relegated to 2017 Thai League 4 Western Region again.

Teams

Stadium and locations

Sponsoring

Foreign players

The number of foreign players is restricted to five per T3 team. A team can use five foreign players on the field in each game, including at least one player from the AFC member countries and one player from nine countries member of ASEAN (3+1+1).
Note :: players who released during summer transfer window;: players who registered during summer transfer window.

League table

Standings

Positions by round

Results by match played

Results

Season statistics

Top scorers
As of 16 September 2017.

Hat-tricks

Attendances

Overall statistical table

Attendances by home match played

Source: Thai League 3
Note: Some error of T3 official match report 25 March 2017 (Kasem Bundit University 4–2 Rajpracha).
 Some error of T3 official match report 2 July 2017 (Simork 3–0 Krung Thonburi).
 Some error of T3 official match report 10 September 2017 (Nara United 1–3 Samut Sakhon).

See also
 2017 Thai League
 2017 Thai League 2
 2017 Thai League 3
 2017 Thai League 4
 2017 Thai FA Cup
 2017 Thai League Cup
 2017 Thai League 3 Upper Region

References

 Thai League 3 Official Website

External links
Clubs data from Thai League 3 official website

Banbueng
Bangkok University Deffo
Chamchuri United
Kasem Bundit University 
Krung Thonburi
MOF Customs United
Nakhon Si Thammarat Unity
Nara United
Rajpracha
Ranong United
Royal Thai Army
Samut Sakhon
Simork
Surat Thani
Trang

Thai League 3
2017 in Thai football leagues